The 2014–15 Welsh Alliance League, known as the Lock Stock Welsh Alliance League for sponsorship reasons, is the 31st season of the Welsh Alliance League, which consists of two divisions: the third and fourth levels of the Welsh football pyramid.

There are fourteen teams in Division 1 and sixteen teams in Division 2, with the champions of Division 1 promoted to the Cymru Alliance. In Division 2, the champions, second place and third place teams are promoted to Division 1.

The season began on 9 August 2014 and concluded on 4 May 2015 with Holywell Town as Division 1 champions. In Division 2, St Asaph City were champions with Llangefni Town and Trearddur Bay finishing second and third place, respectively. All three teams were promoted to Division 1.

Division 1

Teams
Denbigh Town were champions in the previous season and were promoted to the Cymru Alliance. They were replaced by Division 2 champions, Penrhyndeudraeth and runners-up, Kinmel Bay Sports, who were promoted to Division 1.

Grounds and locations

League table

Results

Division 2

Teams
Penrhyndeudraeth were champions in the previous season and were promoted to Division 1 along with runners-up, Kinmel Bay Sports.

Grounds and locations

League table

Results

References

Welsh Alliance League seasons
3
Wales